Sixto César Barrera Ochoa (born September 17, 1983) is a sport wrestler born in Lima, Peru. He carried the Peruvian flag at the opening ceremony of the 2008 Olympics in Beijing, PR China. Barrera won a silver medal at the 2007 Pan American Games.

References
sports-reference

External links
 

1983 births
Living people
Wrestlers at the 2007 Pan American Games
Wrestlers at the 2008 Summer Olympics
Wrestlers at the 2011 Pan American Games
Olympic wrestlers of Peru
Sportspeople from Lima
Pan American Games silver medalists for Peru
Peruvian male sport wrestlers
Pan American Games medalists in wrestling
Medalists at the 2007 Pan American Games
20th-century Peruvian people
21st-century Peruvian people